Kathryn Ann Barger-Leibrich is an American politician, serving as a member of the Los Angeles County Board of Supervisors for the 5th District since 2016. A member of the Republican Party, Barger served as Chair of Los Angeles County from 2019 to 2020. She previously served as Chief Deputy Supervisor and Chief of Staff to her predecessor Mayor Michael D. Antonovich.

Personal life 
Kathryn Barger was born and raised in the 5th District. Barger attended Ohio Wesleyan University in Delaware, Ohio, earning a BA in Communications/Government in 1983. She is married to a retired Sheriff’s deputy and lives in the San Gabriel Valley. Her brother is John M. Barger, who was appointed to the Board of Governors of the United States Postal Service by then-president Donald Trump in 2019.

Career 
Barger began her career in government in 1988 when she interned in the office of Los Angeles County Supervisor Michael D. Antonovich. By 2001 she had risen up the ranks to Antonovich's chief of staff.

Los Angeles County Board of Supervisors

Tenure 
In her role as a county supervisor, Barger has co-authored bills furthering the county’s support for veterans and foster children.

Barger also co-authored motions to address homelessness in LA County, which notably includes a bill passed by the California State Assembly in May 2018 amending the state’s definition of “gravely disabled”, and allowing more state-sponsored medical care to be provided to those who may be suffering from a serious mental illness.

Barger coauthored a motion creating the Blue Ribbon Commission on Public Safety, which was intended to explore the impact that Assembly Bill 109, California Proposition 47, and California Proposition 57, which were collectively aimed at converting many nonviolent drug offenses into misdemeanors and allowing for the early release of some inmates, has had inside of Los Angeles County. The formation of the commission was a reaction to the murder of police Officer Keith Boyer, and ultimately passed on a 3-0 vote with abstentions. The commission membership at its inception was controversial, with critics citing that many of the 27 members drafted to the commission were directly affected by Proposition 47, coming from roles within the county’s judicial system. Other critics noted that linking the murder of Officer Boyer to the passage of criminal reform efforts was misguided because the error that led to the release of Officer Boyer’s murderer was committed at the county level.

In 2017, Barger was the only opposition in a 4-1 vote to eliminate the "registration fee" that the Los Angeles County Public Defender's office and other court-appointed counsel charge defendants before providing them with legal services.

In 2017, Barger was the only opposition in a 4-1 vote to establish the Business Registration program, which would levy a fee on businesses to create a registry and connect them with county resources.

On December 3, 2019, Barger was elected by a unanimous vote of the Board to become its chair, succeeding Janice Hahn.

5th District boundaries 
The Fifth District is the largest Supervisorial district of Los Angeles County, spanning 2,800 square miles, and includes 22 cities and 70 unincorporated communities in the San Gabriel, San Fernando, Santa Clarita and Antelope Valleys.

Political positions

LGBTQ+ Rights 
Barger attended Adrin Nazarian's October 2022 fundraiser brunch for GALAS LGBTQ+ Armenian Society, and presented the organization with a certificate of recognition.

Electoral history

References 

Los Angeles County Board of Supervisors
Women in California politics
California Republicans
Politicians from Los Angeles
Ohio Wesleyan University alumni
Antelope Valley
San Fernando Valley
Living people
Year of birth missing (living people)
21st-century American women